These Dreams: Greatest Hits is a compilation album by the American rock band Heart. It was the final Heart album issued by Capitol Records, the band's label since 1985.

The track list spans the band's history from 1975 through 1995,  though Capitol Records did not have the licensing to some of Heart's earlier work because it was issued on other different labels. Therefore, some of Heart's earlier singles are presented in alternate live acoustic versions, as featured on the 1995 release The Road Home.

Track listing

References

1997 greatest hits albums
Albums produced by Keith Olsen
Albums produced by Mike Flicker
Albums produced by Ron Nevison
Capitol Records compilation albums
Heart (band) compilation albums